Niphidium is a genus of ferns in the family Polypodiaceae, subfamily Polypodioideae, according to the Pteridophyte Phylogeny Group classification of 2016 (PPG I). They are  native to tropical America.

Species 
, Checklist of Ferns and Lycophytes of the World accepted the following species:
Niphidium albopunctatissimum (J.Sm.) Lellinger
Niphidium anocarpos (Kunze) Lellinger
Niphidium carinatum Lellinger
Niphidium crassifolium (L.) Lellinger
Niphidium longifolium (Cav.) C.V.Morton & Lellinger
Niphidium macbridei Lellinger
Niphidium mortonianum Lellinger
Niphidium nidulare (Rosenst.) Lellinger
Niphidium oblanceolatum A.Rojas
Niphidium rufosquamatum Lellinger
Niphidium vittaria (Mett.) Lellinger

References

External links 
  Niphidium species

Polypodiaceae
Fern genera